{{DISPLAYTITLE:C24H29FO4}}
The molecular formula C24H29FO4 (molar mass: 400.49 g/mol) may refer to:

 DU-41164
 DU-41165, or 6-fluoro-16-methylene-17α-acetoxy-δ6-retroprogesterone

Molecular formulas